is a passenger railway station located in the city of Mitoyo, Kagawa Prefecture, Japan. It is operated by JR Shikoku and has the station number "Y18".

Lines
Motoyama Station is served by the JR Shikoku Yosan Line and is located 52.4 km from the beginning of the line at Takamatsu. Dosan line local, Rapid Sunport, and Nanpū Relay services stop at the station. In addition, there are two trains a day running a local service on the Seto-Ōhashi Line which stop at the station.

Layout
The station, which is unstaffed, consists of an island platform serving two tracks. A traditional Japanese style timber station building houses a waiting room and a noodle shop. Access to the platforms is by means of a level crossing.

Adjacent stations

History
At that time the station was operated by Japanese Government Railways, later becoming Japanese National Railways (JNR). With the privatization of JNR on 1 April 1987, control of the station passed to JR Shikoku.

Surrounding area
Motoyama-ji, 70th temple of the Shikoku Pilgrimage
Mitoyo City Hall Toyonaka Government Building (former Toyonaka Town Hall)
Kagawa Prefectural Kasada High School

See also
 List of railway stations in Japan

References

External links

Station timetable

Railway stations in Kagawa Prefecture
Railway stations in Japan opened in 1913
Mitoyo, Kagawa